The second season of the American television drama series The Americans, consisting of 13 episodes, premiered on FX on February 26, 2014, and concluded on May 21, 2014. The series was renewed for the second season on February 21, 2013.

Cast

Main
 Keri Russell as Elizabeth Jennings (Nadezhda), a KGB officer
 Matthew Rhys as Philip Jennings (Mischa), a KGB officer
 Annet Mahendru as Nina Sergeevna Krilova, Agent Beeman's Soviet mole
 Susan Misner as Sandra Beeman, Stan's wife
 Alison Wright as Martha Hanson, Agent Gaad's secretary and Philip's informant
 Holly Taylor as Paige Jennings, Elizabeth and Philip's daughter
 Keidrich Sellati as Henry Jennings, Elizabeth and Philip's son
 Noah Emmerich as FBI Agent Stan Beeman

Recurring
 Lev Gorn as Arkady Ivanovich Zotov, the KGB's Rezident
 Costa Ronin as Oleg Igorevich Burov, a new KGB officer
 Richard Thomas as Agent Frank Gaad, Special Agent In Charge of the FBI Counterintelligence Division
 Lee Tergesen as Andrew Larrick, an American naval officer who helps the Russians with a mission, only to seek revenge when it goes wrong
 Owen Campbell as Jared Connors, the son of two KGB illegals
 Wrenn Schmidt as Kate, Philip and Elizabeth's new KGB handler
 Michael Aronov as Anton Baklanov, a scientist involved in stealth technology
 Aimee Carrero as Lucia, a Sandinista freedom fighter
 Kelly AuCoin as Pastor Tim, the head of a church Paige Jennings attends
 Margo Martindale as Claudia, the Jennings' KGB supervisor
 Daniel Flaherty as Matthew Beeman, Stan's son
 Peter Von Berg as Vasili Nikolaevich, a KGB Resident
 Gillian Alexy as Annelise, an informant of Philip's
 Rahul Khanna as Yousaf Rana, an officer in the Pakistani ISI Covert Action Division
 Reg Rogers as Charles Duluth, a journalist and KGB source
 Karen Pittman as Lisa, a Northrop employee from whom Elizabeth is gleaning information
 John Carroll Lynch as Fred, a KGB officer

Production
Susan Misner, Annet Mahendru, and Alison Wright, who play Sandra Beeman, Nina, and Martha Hanson, respectively, are promoted to series regulars in season two, after having recurring roles in the first season. Filming for the second season began on October 9, 2013, according to Keri Russell.

On April 7, 2014, it was announced that Pete Townshend collaborated with series music composer Nathan Barr on an original song, titled "It Must Be Done", for the April 30 episode "Yousaf".

Episodes

Reception

Reviews
Review aggregator Metacritic has given the season a score of 88 out of 100 (based on 31 critics), signifying "universal acclaim". On Rotten Tomatoes, another review aggregator site, it holds a 97% "Certified Fresh" rating with an average score of 8.8 out of 10, based on 37 reviews.

Accolades
For the 30th TCA Awards, The Americans was nominated for Outstanding Achievement in Drama and Matthew Rhys was nominated for Individual Achievement in Drama. For the 4th Critics' Choice Television Awards, the series received four nominations, including for Best Drama Series, Matthew Rhys for Best Actor in a Drama Series, Keri Russell for Best Actress in a Drama Series, and Annet Mahendru for Best Supporting Actress in a Drama Series. For the 66th Primetime Emmy Awards, Margo Martindale was nominated for Outstanding Guest Actress in a Drama Series. For the 19th Satellite Awards, Keri Russell won for Best Actress in a Drama Series.

Home media releases
The second season was released only on DVD format in region 1 on December 16, 2014, and in region 2 on January 26, 2015. Special features include two featurettes—"Operation Ghost Stories: The Real Directorate 'S'" and "Shades of Red: The Mortality of the Americans"; gag reel; and deleted scenes.

References

External links
 
 

Season 2
2014 American television seasons
Television series set in 1982